Khonkholoy is a rural locality (a selo) in Mukhorshibirsky District, Republic of Buryatia, Russia. The population was 1,590 as of 2010. There are 18 streets.

Geography 
Khonkholoy is located 29 km northeast of Mukhorshibir (the district's administrative centre) by road. Nikolsk is the nearest rural locality.

References 

Rural localities in Mukhorshibirsky District